Charles de Lint (born December 22, 1951) is a Canadian writer of Dutch, Spanish, and Japanese ancestry. He is married to, and plays music with, MaryAnn Harris.

Primarily a writer of fantasy fiction, he has composed works of urban fantasy, contemporary magical realism, and mythic fiction. Along with authors like Terri Windling, Emma Bull, and John Crowley, de Lint during the 1980s pioneered and popularized the genre of urban fantasy. He writes novels, novellas, short stories, poetry, and lyrics. His most famous works include: the Newford series of books (Dreams Underfoot, Widdershins, The Blue Girl, The Onion Girl, Moonlight and Vines, Someplace to be Flying, etc.), as well as Moonheart, The Mystery of Grace, The Painted Boy and A Circle of Cats (children's book illustrated by Charles Vess). His distinctive style of fantasy uses American folklore and European folklore; de Lint was influenced by many authors of mythology, folklore, and science fiction, including J. R. R. Tolkien, Lord Dunsany, William Morris, Mervyn Peake, James Branch Cabell, and E. R. Eddison. Some of his mythic fiction poetry can be found online on the Endicott Studio website.

As an essayist/critic/folklorist he writes book reviews for The Magazine of Fantasy & Science Fiction, has judged several literary awards, and has been a writer-in-residence for two public libraries.

Personal life
Charles de Lint was born in 1951 in Bussum, in North Holland in the Netherlands. His family emigrated to Canada when he was four months old. He grew up in Canada, as well as overseas, but has lived in Ottawa since he was age eleven.

In 1974 he met MaryAnn Harris, and they married in 1980. They now live in Ottawa.  Harris is first editor of de Lint's fiction and also his business manager.

MaryAnn Harris has been hospitalized since September 6, 2021 for a rare and debilitating tick-borne virus.

Career
During his late twenties to early thirties, de Lint worked in a record store and played with a Celtic musical band during weekends.

Writing
Charles de Lint started writing in 1983 and has been a full-time writer ever since, publishing about forty books between 1984 and 1997, and 71 books (excluding foreign editions and reprints), in total, thus gaining a reputation as a master of fantasy.

He published three horror novels using the pseudonym Samuel M. Key which have subsequently been reprinted by Orb Books as by Charles de Lint.  He has also published a children's book, A Circle of Cats, illustrated by artist Charles Vess.

Style and settings
His main genre, that of contemporary fantasy, which combines the real world with the "otherworld", allows the co-existence of the natural and the supernatural. This has been termed a metaphor for the lack of indigenous folklore in most of Canada living side-by-side with the living oral traditions of the Native Americans.  De Lint, however, draws upon not only North American Aboriginal culture, but also the folklore of other cultures. For example, his novel, Moonheart, uses elements of both Native American and Welsh folklore.

Many of his early books are set in Ottawa, while others (1990–2009) have been set mainly in his fictional North American city of Newford, inspired by de Lint's favourite aspects of various North American cities. A regular set of characters are used in many different books. More recently, de Lint published an adult novel, The Mystery of Grace (Tor 2009), set in his fictional Southwestern US town, Santa de Vado Viejo, as was his most recent young adult novel, The Painted Boy (Viking 2010).

Recognition
De Lint has received many awards, including the 2000 World Fantasy Award for Best Collection for Moonlight and Vines, the Ontario Library Association's White Pine Award, as well as the Great Lakes Great Books Award for his young adult novel The Blue Girl (Viking, 2004). In 1988 he won the Canadian SF/Fantasy Award, the Casper (now known as the Aurora) for his novel Jack, the Giant-killer (Ace 1987). His novel Widdershins (Tor, 2006) won first place, Amazon.com Editors' Picks: Top 10 Science Fiction & Fantasy Books of 2006.  His 1984 urban fantasy novel, Moonheart, was a best-selling trade paperback for Tor's Orb line. It has been described as a thriller, detective mystery, and otherworld mythic fantasy all in one.

Other literary work
In addition to being the author of numerous novels and short stories, de Lint is also a poet, folklorist, and critic. His poetry can be found online in the Endicott Studio Journal of Mythic Arts. He has taught creative writing workshops in Canada and the United States, and was writer‑in‑residence for two public libraries in Ottawa. He has also written original songs; his main instruments are flute, fiddle, whistles, vocals and guitar. In 2011, de Lint released his first CD, Old Blue Truck De Lint has also been a judge for the Nebula Award, the World Fantasy Award, the Theodore Sturgeon Award and the Bram Stoker Award.

Music and art
De Lint plays folk, Irish and Celtic music with his wife MaryAnn; at one time playing at a local pub, and most recently doing concerts at FaerieWorlds and FaerieCon West in Seattle. He plays multiple instruments and sings and writes his own songs. In 2011 de Lint released his first album, Old Blue Truck, which was released alongside his wife MaryAnn Harris's album, Crow Girls  in which he also contributes.

Bibliography

Novels 
 
 
 
 
 
 
 
 
 
 
 
 
 
 
 
 
The Wild Wood (Brian Froud's Faerielands, Illustrated by Brian Froud) (1994)
Memory and Dream (1994)
Someplace to Be Flying  (1998)
The Road to Lisdoonvarna (2001)
The Blue Girl (2004)
The Mystery of Grace (2009)
Eyes Like Leaves (2009)
Under My Skin (2012)
Over My Head (2013)
Out of This World (2014)
The Wind in His Heart (2017)
Juniper Wiles (2021)
Juniper Wiles and the Ghost Girls (2022)

Young adult novels 
Some additional young adult novels are listed under their series name below.
Little (Grrl) Lost (2007)
The Painted Boy (2010)
The Cats of Tanglewood Forest (illustrated by Charles Vess) (2013)
Seven Wild Sisters: A Modern Fairy Tale (illustrated by Charles Vess) (2002)

Novellas 
Berlin (1989)
The Fair in Emain Macha (1990)
Our Lady of the Harbour (1991)-1992 World Fantasy award nominee
Paperjack (1992)-1993 World Fantasy award nominee
Death Leaves an Echo (part of three novella collection, Cafe Purgatoriam) (1991)
A Circle of Cats (illustrated by Charles Vess) (2003)-2004 World Fantasy award nominee
Promises to Keep (2007,  Tachyon Publications)

Chapbooks 
 Laughter in the Leaves (1984) 
 Ghosts of Wind and Shadow (1991)
 Refinerytown (2003)
 This Moment (2005)
 Make A Joyful Noise (2006)
 Old Man Crow (2007)
 Riding Shotgun (2007)
 Yellow Dog (2008)

Short stories published in book form 
Ascian in Rose (1987) (re-published in Spiritwalk)
Westlin Wind (1989) (re-published in Spiritwalk)
Uncle Dobbin's Parrot Fair (1991) (re-published in Dreams Underfoot)
Our Lady of the Harbour (1991) (re-published in Dreams Underfoot)
Paperjack (1991) (re-published in Dreams Underfoot)
Merlin Dreams in the Mondream Wood (1992) (re-published in Spiritwalk)
The Wishing Well (1993) (re-published in The Ivory and the Horn)
The Buffalo Man (1999) (re-published in Tapping the Dream Tree)

Collections 
De Grijze Roos ("The Grey Rose") (1983)
Hedgework and Guessery  (1991)
Spiritwalk (1992)
Dreams Underfoot (1993)
The Ivory and the Horn (1995)
Jack of Kinrowan (1995)
Moonlight and Vines (1999)
The Newford Stories (1999) (contains the stories from Dreams Underfoot, The Ivory and the Horn, and Moonlight and Vines)
Triskell Tales (2000)
Waifs and Strays (2002)
Tapping the Dream Tree (2002)
A Handful of Coppers (Collected Early Stories, Vol.1: Heroic Fantasy) (2003)
Quicksilver & Shadow (Collected Early Stories, Vol.2) (2004)
The Hour Before Dawn (2005)
Triskell Tales 2 (2006)
What the Mouse Found (2008)
Woods and Waters Wild (2009)
Muse and Reverie (2009)
The Very Best of Charles de Lint (2010, Tachyon Publications)

Newford series 
Newford is a fictional North American city where Charles de Lint has set many of his novels and short stories. Human beings share the city with European and Native American mythological legends, finding common ground as they live out their daily lives or find themselves swept up in adventures.
The Dreaming Place (young adult, illustrated by Brian Froud) (1990)
From a Whisper to a Scream (first published under the pseudonym Samuel M. Key) (1992)
Dreams Underfoot (1993)
I'll Be Watching You (first published under the pseudonym Samuel M. Key) (1994)
Memory and Dream (1994)
The Ivory and the Horn (1995)
Trader (1997)-1998 World Fantasy Award nominee
Someplace to Be Flying (1998)-1999 World Fantasy Award nominee
Moonlight and Vines (1999)
The Newford Stories (1999) (compiles Dreams Underfoot, The Ivory and the Horn, and Moonlight and Vines)
Forests of the Heart (2000)-2000 Nebula Award nominee
The Onion Girl (2001)-2002 World Fantasy Award nominee
Seven Wild Sisters (novella illustrated by Charles Vess) (2002)-2003 World Fantasy Award nominee
Tapping the Dream Tree (2002)
Spirits in the Wires (2003)
A Circle of Cats (2003) (written as a children's book)
Medicine Road (illustrated by Charles Vess,  Tachyon Publications) (2004)
The Blue Girl (young adult) (2004)
The Hour Before Dawn (2005)
Widdershins (2006)
Promises to Keep (2007, Tachyon Publications)
Old Man Crow (2007)
Dingo (young adult) (2008)
Muse and Reverie (2009)
Juniper Wiles (2021)
Juniper Wiles and the Ghost Girls (2022)

 Short stories 
 "The Valley of the Troll" in Sword and Sorceress I (1984)
 "Cold Blows The Wind" in Sword and Sorceress II (1985)
 "The Weeping Oak" in Sword and Sorceress IV (1987)
 "Into the Green" in Sword and Sorceress V (1988)
 "One Chance" in Werewolves (edited by Jane Yolen and Martin H. Greenberg). Reprinted in Bruce Coville's Book of Spine Tinglers (1988)
 "Companions to the Moon" in Realms of Fantasy (June, 2007). Reprinted in Peter S. Beagle's The Urban Fantasy (2011) 
 "Ten for the Devil" in Battle Magic (Daw Books). Reprinted in Tim Pratt's Sympathy for the Devil (2010)
 "The Butter Spirit's Tithe (2004) in Emerald MagicDe Lint also scripted several comic books for Barry Blair's Aircel Publishing in the mid-1980s.

His short story, "The Sacred Fire", was made into a short film by Peter Billingsley and Robert Meyer Burnett in 1994. Originally set on and near the campus of Butler University, the setting was changed to Beverly Hills for the film. It was also adapted as an episode of The Hunger in January 2000.

 Review columns 
De Lint writes a regular review column called "Books to Look For" for the Magazine of Fantasy and Science Fiction.

Discography
 Old Blue Truck (2011)
 Crow Girls (MaryAnn Harris) (2011)
 The Loon's Lament—digital single (2011) (previously released on the album A Walk on the Windy Side'' in 2002).

References

External links 

 Charles de Lint
 
 At OFearna's site
 Year's Best 2012: Charles de Lint on "A Tangle of Green Men"
 Locus Online: Charles de Lint interview excerpts (issue 6, June 2003)
 Interview with Charles de Lint ( Challenging Destiny Number 9, 2000)
 Kim Antieau: Interview with Charles de Lint (April 28, 2008)
 Charles de Lint – SF Signal (2010)
 Bookslut: An Interview with Charles de Lint (June 2006)
 Charles de Lint – Online Radio Interview with the Author (December 2009)
 Charles de Lint: Interview by NerdHelm (2011)
 Fantasy, Rockabilly & Grace: An Interview with Genre Master Charles De Lint (March 2009)
 Green Man's Charles de Lint Edition
 Someplace to Be Flying: An Interview with Charles de Lint by Michael McCarty

1951 births
20th-century Canadian male writers
20th-century Canadian non-fiction writers
20th-century Canadian novelists
20th-century Canadian poets
20th-century Canadian short story writers
20th-century essayists
21st-century Canadian male writers
21st-century Canadian non-fiction writers
21st-century Canadian novelists
21st-century Canadian poets
21st-century Canadian short story writers
21st-century essayists
Canadian Celtic music
Canadian fantasy writers
Canadian folklorists
Canadian horror writers
Canadian literary critics
Canadian male non-fiction writers
Canadian male novelists
Canadian male poets
Canadian multi-instrumentalists
Canadian people of Dutch descent
Canadian songwriters
Canadian speculative fiction critics
Canadian speculative fiction writers
Canadian writers of young adult literature
Dutch emigrants to Canada
Living people
The Magazine of Fantasy & Science Fiction people
Magic realism writers
Mythopoeic writers
Lint, Charles De
Science fiction critics
Trope theorists
Urban fantasy
Urban fantasy writers
Weird fiction writers
World Fantasy Award-winning writers
Writers from Ottawa
Writers of Gothic fiction